Schweizer Radio: Radio der deutschen und rätoromanischen Schweiz (SR DRS; "Swiss Radio: Radio of the German and Romansh Switzerland") was a company of SRG SSR which operated the public German-language radio stations of Switzerland from 1931 until 2012.

On 1 January 2011, Schweizer Fernsehen (SF) and Schweizer Radio DRS began the process of merging the two entities into Schweizer Radio und Fernsehen (SRF). On 16 December 2012, the merger was complete, with SF and SR DRS adopting the Schweizer Radio und Fernsehen (SRF) name.

Broadcasting 
SR DRS own six radio stations, which in German-speaking Switzerland has a market share of over 60%.

Radio stations 
 DRS 1
 DRS 2
 DRS 3
 DRS Musikwelle
 DRS Virus
 DRS 4 News

External links 

 Official website

Swiss Broadcasting Corporation
Radio in Switzerland
German-language mass media in Switzerland